Leach Botanical Garden is a  botanical garden located in outer southeast Portland, Oregon, near S.E. 122nd Avenue and Foster Road.  It was acquired by the Portland Parks Bureau in 1972.

History

The garden was established in 1931 as landscaping for the private home of botanist Lilla Leach and pharmacist John Leach, and subsequently donated to the city. The garden was originally named Sleepy Hollow. The Leaches built their cottage-style manor house on the property in 1936. They lived in a stone cottage near Johnson Creek during the summer before the house was completed.

Lilla Leach was the first recipient of the Eloise Payne Luquer Medal, awarded by the Garden Club of America in 1950, for distinguished achievement in botany.  From 1945 until 1948, she was director of Save the Myrtle Wood, Inc.

Following the Leaches' deaths, the garden was left to the City of Portland with the stipulation that the city had ten years to take over maintenance of the garden, or the land would go to the YMCA.

The Gardens
The garden currently features a diverse collection of over 2,000 hybrids, cultivars, native and non-native plants, including alpines, medicinal herbs, rock garden plants, camellias, and 40 genera and over 125 species of ferns. Many are labeled. The property is divided by Johnson Creek and most of the land is on an incline. A self-guided tour winds along trails with views of firs, ferns, and wildflowers. As of 2010, the garden's director was David Porter.

Photo Gallery

See also
 List of botanical gardens in the United States

References

External links 

Leach Botanical Garden on PortlandOnline
Unique crafts and classes abound at Leach Garden - East Portland News

1931 establishments in Oregon
Botanical gardens in Portland, Oregon
Parks in Portland, Oregon
Southeast Portland, Oregon